Love 360 is a 2022 Indian Kannada-language romantic crime thriller film directed by Shashank starring debutant Praveen Kumar and Rachana Inder. 

The film released on 19 August 2022 and received rave reviews from critics.

Plot 
Ram and Janaki alias Jaanu are childhood friends from orphanage, who grow up to become the most doting lovers. Jaanu actually suffers from Selective Memory Loss, and Ram tries to improve her mental condition, and also protect her from anyone with utmost passion. Jaanu becomes interested in Bharatanatyam, and Ram somehow gets her admitted to the school. 

However, things take a disastrous turn when Jaanu is accused of killing her classmate Vibha, a rich girl. Ram begins his investigation and suspect Vibha's boyfriend Vicky, a drug peddler, and brings him to the interrogation room. Vicky reveals that Vibha planned to get her father killed in order to inherit his wealth, as her father was having an extramartial affair with another woman, but Vicky backed out of this idea, which leads to breakup between them. 

Later, Ram meets Vicky's friend, who tells that he was the reason behind Vicky and Vibha's breakup. When Vicky left, Jaanu arrived to apologize to Vibha for a fight happened in the class. However, Vibha doesn't pay a heed and calls her "mental" which enrages Jaanu and kills Vibha by crushing her skull with a rock. Ram gets distraught after learning this. Later, Vicky's friend tells that he can help him save Jaanu, in exchange for sex. Enraged, Ram kills Vicky's friend and throws in the sea, and manages to frame Vicky in the murder. Jaanu is released and Ram finally moves with Jaanu to their new house.

Cast 
Praveen Kumar as Raam aka Mr. Perfect 360
Rachana Inder as Janaki aka Jaanu
Gopalakrishna Deshpande as police inspector
Kavya Shastri
Sukanya Girish
Danny Kuttappa
Mahantesh Hiremath
Sujith

Production 
Newcomer Praveen makes his film debut with this film. The 360 part of the title is based on AB de Villiers, a cricketer who is called Mr 360.

Soundtrack 
Music by Arjun Janya. The song "Jagave Neenu Gelathiye" is sung by Sid Sriram.

Reception 
Love 360 received positive reviews from critics. 

Shyam Prasad of Chitraloka rated 4/5 stars and praised the direction, writing, technical aspects and also the lead actors' performances. Shuklaji of The News Minute said that "Love 360 is a commendable take on the idea of virtues, and how true love transcends all". Jagadish Angadi of Deccan Herald opined that "The romantic thriller is a one-time watch along with family members despite flaws". Sunayana Suresh of The Times of India wrote that "Eventually, Love 360 is a film that works because of its second half and the twists, irrespective of whether it may be inspired or not". A. Sharadhaa of The New Indian Express praised several aspects of the film including Shashank's direction, the actors' performance, the music and the cinematography.

Box office 
The film completed 35 days run in many centres across Karnataka and was declared as a commercial success at the box office.

References

External links 

2020s Kannada-language films
Indian crime drama films